Yamato Machida (町田 也真人, born December 19, 1989) is a Japanese footballer who plays as a midfielder for Oita Trinita in the J1 League.

Career 
After graduating high school he entered the Senshu University where he represented them at football. After graduation in 2012, he signed for JEF United Chiba. He made his debut in the away loss (0–2) against Kyoto Sanga FC on 11 March 2012 by replacing Kazuki Oiwa in the 89th minute.

Club statistics
Updated to 19 December 2018.

1Includes J1 Promotion Playoffs.

References

External links
Profile at JEF United Chiba

1989 births
Living people
Senshu University alumni
Association football people from Saitama Prefecture
Japanese footballers
J1 League players
J2 League players
JEF United Chiba players
Matsumoto Yamaga FC players
Oita Trinita players
Association football midfielders